Caveman Shoestore was an avant-prog group founded in 1991 by bassist Fred Chalenor, percussionist Henry Franzoni and keyboardist/vocalist Elaine di Falco.

History
Bassist Fred Chalenor and drummer Henry Franzoni had frequently collaborated since 1976, most notably in the band Face Ditch. While Chalenor and Franzoni were playing at a music festival in Portland, OR, when they met vocalist Elaine di Falco, who was performing in the punk group God Wads. The trio decided to form Caveman Shoestore and recorded a ten track cassette titled Rock in 1991.

Their debut studio album, titled Master Cylinder, was released by Tim/Kerr Records in 1992. The album drew from a wide range of influences, including Conlon Nancarrow and Black Sabbath, and was compared to Discipline-era King Crimson. They followed up that album with 1994's Flux, which featured Amy DeVargas on vocals. The band collaborated with Hugh Hopper for Caveman Hughscore, released in 1995. After a ten year hiatus, the band reunited and released their third full-length album Super Sale in 2005.

Discography
Studio albums
Master Cylinder (Tim/Kerr, 1992)
Flux (Tim/Kerr, 1994)
Caveman Hughscore (Tim/Kerr, 1995)
Super Sale (Build-a-Buzz, 2005)

References

External links

American progressive rock groups
American art rock groups
Jazz fusion ensembles
Rock in Opposition
Musical groups established in 1991
Musical groups disestablished in 2005
1991 establishments in Oregon
2005 disestablishments in Oregon
Musical groups from Portland, Oregon